The Arroio Guaçu River is a river of Paraná state in southern Brazil.

See also
List of rivers of Paraná

References
Road map of Parana State

Rivers of Paraná (state)
Tributaries of the Paraná River